In geometry, the small rhombihexacron (or small dipteral disdodecahedron) is the dual of the small rhombihexahedron. It is visually identical to the small hexacronic icositetrahedron. Its faces are antiparallelograms formed by pairs of coplanar triangles.

Proportions
The dihedral angle equals . The ratio between the lengths of the long edges and the short ones equals .

References

External links

Dual uniform polyhedra